Hornung & Møller was a Danish piano factory that operated from 1827 to 1972.

History
Hornung & Møller dominated the piano industry in the mid-1800s and introduced the cast iron frame. The company was founded by Conrad Christian Hornung (b Skælskør July 1801-Copenhagen 11 June 1873)  a hat-maker from Skælskør, who became interested in piano making during a visit to Germany.

After studying in Germany, he returned to Denmark, where he produced his first piano in 1827 and established a shop in his native town of Skælskør. The company moved to Slagelse in 1834 and to Copenhagen in 1842.

In 1851, he transferred the entire company to his employee Hans Peter Møller, whose name was added to the company's name. At Møller 's death in 1859, the company was led by his widow, with his 20-year-old son Frederik Møller as general manager. The factory moved to Dehns Palace in Bredgade in 1872, which was also used as a showcase for the instruments.

From 1843, the factory became the royal court supplier. In 1907 it became a public limited company.

The company produced tablecloths (until 1880), upright pianos, and flies and is credited with the development of several regulating tools sold by Hammacher Schlemmer, Lyon and Healy and Dolge.

The factory closed in July 1972 after producing more than 50,000 instruments.

Management

 1827-1851: C.C. Hornung
 1851-1859: Hans Peter Møller
 1859-1917: Frederik Møller
 1878-1926: Conrad Møller
 1907-1951: Axel R. Møller
 1907-1967: Knud Møller
 1951-1972: Bjørn Møller

See also
 Louis Zwicki

References

External links 

 JOURNAL ARTICLE C. C. Hornung and the Single-Cast Iron Frame: An Early Break-Through in the Danish Piano Industry

Purveyors to the Court of Denmark
Danish companies established in 1827
Defunct companies of Denmark
Manufacturing companies disestablished in 1972
Manufacturing companies based in Copenhagen
Piano manufacturing companies
Musical instrument manufacturing companies of Denmark
People from Slagelse Municipality